Redway is a census-designated place (CDP) in Humboldt County, California, United States. The population was 1,225 at the 2010 census, up from 1,188 at the 2000 census. Redway is also home to Redway Elementary School, with grades K–6.

Geography

History
The town was founded by Oscar and Charles Burris in 1923.

Originally, Redway was a resort-style golf course in operation . This is evident by some of the street names such as "Birdie", "Par", and "Green". In the 1930s, the Burris brothers formed a subdivision of summer homes.

Demographics

2010
The 2010 United States Census reported that Redway had a population of 1,225. The racial makeup of Redway was 1,093 (89.2%) White, 5 (0.4%) African American, 35 (2.9%) Native American, 6 (0.5%) Asian, 1 (0.1%) Pacific Islander, 15 (1.2%) from other races, and 70 (5.7%) from two or more races. Hispanic or Latino of any race were 96 persons (7.8%).

The Census reported that 1,192 people (97.3% of the population) lived in households, 33 (2.7%) lived in non-institutionalized group quarters, and 0 (0%) were institutionalized.

There were 551 households, out of which 160 (29.0%) had children under the age of 18 living in them, 194 (35.2%) were opposite-sex married couples living together, 63 (11.4%) had a female householder with no husband present, 37 (6.7%) had a male householder with no wife present.  There were 55 (10.0%) unmarried opposite-sex partnerships, and 4 (0.7%) same-sex married couples or partnerships. 209 households (37.9%) were made up of individuals, and 63 (11.4%) had someone living alone who was 65 years of age or older. The average household size was 2.16.  There were 294 families (53.4% of all households); the average family size was 2.84.

The population was spread out, with 278 people (22.7%) under the age of 18, 92 people (7.5%) aged 18 to 24, 306 people (25.0%) aged 25 to 44, 404 people (33.0%) aged 45 to 64, and 145 people (11.8%) who were 65 years of age or older.  The median age was 40.8 years. For every 100 females, there were 93.8 males.  For every 100 females age 18 and over, there were 90.5 males.

The homeowner vacancy rate was 1.6%; the rental vacancy rate was 1.2%.  658 people (53.7% of the population) lived in owner-occupied housing units and 534 people (43.6%) lived in rental housing units.

2000
As of the census of 2000, there were 1,188 people, 543 households, and 302 families residing in the CDP. The racial makeup of the CDP was 89.39% White, 0.17% Black or African American, 2.53% Native American, 0.51% Asian, 0.08% Pacific Islander, 0.76% from other races, and 6.57% from two or more races.  3.62% of the population were Hispanic or Latino of any race.

There were 543 households, out of which 29.1% had children under the age of 18 living with them, 36.6% were married couples living together, 13.6% had a female householder with no husband present, and 44.2% were non-families. 33.9% of all households were made up of individuals, and 8.8% had someone living alone who was 65 years of age or older.  The average household size was 2.19 and the average family size was 2.80.

In the CDP, the population was spread out, with 24.7% under the age of 18, 7.1% from 18 to 24, 26.1% from 25 to 44, 27.6% from 45 to 64, and 14.6% who were 65 years of age or older.  The median age was 41 years. For every 100 females, there were 95.1 males.  For every 100 females age 18 and over, there were 89.6 males.

The median income for a household in the CDP was $27,188, and the median income for a family was $39,464. Males had a median income of $21,853 versus $23,864 for females. The per capita income for the CDP was $24,212.  About 18.6% of families and 17.0% of the population were below the poverty line, including 24.8% of those under age 18 and none of those age 65 or over.

Politics

This area is represented locally by county supervisor Michelle Bushnell

See also
 
 Emerald City, California

References

External links
 Garberville/Redway Chamber of Commerce

Census-designated places in Humboldt County, California
Populated places established in 1923
Census-designated places in California